H. Scott Salinas is an American film score composer and musician.

Biography
H. Scott Salinas is a composer and musician based in Los Angeles.

He composed the brooding hybrid orchestral score to the Darren Aronofsky produced drama thriller Zipper; the original song "Jamie Smiles" written for the comedy Just Friends; and was the instrumental mouthpiece behind the Old Spice whistle.

Salinas scored Hulu's documentary series Sasquatch, CBS All Access' Coyote, and HBO's documentary miniseries Tiger.

In 2002, Salinas became the youngest Grand Prize recipient of the Turner Classic Movies Young Film Composers Competition and along with the Cannes Lion, Clio, and BMI awards.

Salinas' music can also be heard on National Geographic's documentary Sea of Shadows; Apple TV's The Banker, a 1960 civil rights, heist, thriller, with a jazz and orchestra score recorded at Abbey Road London and Capitol Records, Los Angeles; Hulu's detective thriller series Baghdad Central, which earned him a BAFTA TV Award-nomination for Best Original Music; FX's documentary mini-series The Most Dangerous Animal of All; ESPN 30 for 30's two-part documentary series Lance; Showtime's four-part documentary series The Trade; Investigation Discovery's crime series Murder in the Heartland.

Salinas has also contributed towards Aaron Sorkin's HBO drama series The Newsroom; George Nolfi's Bruce Lee action fable Birth of the Dragon and HBO Max's Kung Fu action series Warrior, both of which he co-composed with Reza Safinia; as well as Matthew Heineman's documentary film Cartel Land, which he co-composed with Jackson Greenberg.

Work and credits

Films

Television

Video Games

References

Year of birth missing (living people)
Living people
American television composers
American film score composers
American reggae guitarists
American blues guitarists
Princeton University alumni